Bachelor Brides is a 1926 American silent comedy film directed by William K. Howard and starring Rod La Rocque, Elinor Fair and Eulalie Jensen. It is based on a 1925 British-set stage play by Charles Horace Malcolm.

The film's sets were designed by the art director Max Parker.

Cast
 Rod La Rocque as Percy Ashfield - Earl of Duncraggan 
 Elinor Fair as Mary Bowing 
 Eulalie Jensen as Lady Ashfield Duncraggan 
 George Nichols as Henry Bowing 
 Lucien Littlefield as Egbert Beamish 
 Eddie Gribbon as Glasgow Willie - aka Limehouse Herbert 
 Julia Faye as Pansy Short 
 Paul Nicholson as Jim Short - alias Dr.Raymond Strang, M.D. 
 Sally Rand as Maid

References

Bibliography
 Goble, Alan. The Complete Index to Literary Sources in Film. Walter de Gruyter, 1999. 
 Munden, Kenneth White. The American Film Institute Catalog of Motion Pictures Produced in the United States, Part 1. University of California Press, 1997.

External links

1926 films
Silent American comedy films
Films directed by William K. Howard
American silent feature films
1920s English-language films
Producers Distributing Corporation films
Films set in England
1926 comedy films
Films with screenplays by Garrett Fort
American films based on plays
1920s American films